Chashme Buddoor is a 1981 Indian romantic comedy-buddy film directed by Sai Paranjape and produced by Gul Anand and his sister Jayshree Anand–Makhija. The film stars Farooq Sheikh, Deepti Naval, Rakesh Bedi, Ravi Baswani and Leela Mishra in lead roles. The story revolves around three close friends who fall in love with a girl named Neha. Two of the friends fail to woo her and decide to seek revenge after discovering that their third roommate is dating the girl. The remake version directed by David Dhawan and the original digitally restored film were both released on 5 April 2013. The lyrics written by Indu Jain were composed by Raj Kamal and sung by Yesudas and Hemanti Shukla.

Plot 

Siddharth Parashar (Farooq Sheikh), Omi Sharma (Rakesh Bedi) and Jomo Lakhanpal (Ravi Baswani) are close friends and roommates who are studying at Delhi University. Siddharth has completed M.A. in Economics and is preparing for PhD. While Siddharth is a studious boy who loves to spend most of his time with books, his friends Omi and Jomo are mostly busy chasing girls. The only thing common among the three of them is smoking. They Used to buy cigarettes from local paan shop owned by Lallanmiyan (Saeed Jaffrey).One day, Omi and Jomo spot a girl named Neha Rajan (Deepti Naval) from their balcony and try to impress her one by one by their tricks. However, both of them give up after experiencing shameful events. After some days, Neha visits their flat as the salesgirl of Chamko washing powder. Omi and Jomo quickly hide as soon as they spot her from the peep hole. Siddharth meets Neha for the first time and soon a love story begins. Meanwhile, Siddharth gets a job in company where Neha's father is manager. He too gets impressed by Siddharth and sees a prospective son-in-law in him. However, when Omi and Jomo discover their relationship, they decide to plot something to end their relationship and also to seek revenge to the embarrassment inflicted upon them by the girl. Initially, they succeed in creating a false image of Neha's character and separating Siddharth and Neha, but later on repent when they realise that Siddharth's love for Neha is genuine and he has started losing his interest in work and study and is most likely to end his life as well. Neha is clueless about abrupt change in Siddharth's behaviour. Finally, Omi and Jomo decide to reunite both the lovers. As a spate of kidnapping (especially of young girls) has started in Delhi, Omi and Jomo plan a fake kidnapping of Neha along with her grandmother (Leela Mishra) where Siddharth will rescue her. Unfortunately, she is kidnapped by the real gang and the duo is left in the lurch. Siddharth fights with real kidnappers and police arrive at the scene with Lallanmiyan to arrest the gang. The later part of the story revolves on how they clear the confusion that she has been going through and how she was kidnapped by real thugs and finally rescued.

Production 
Chashme Buddoor was produced by Gul Anand and Jayshree Anand- Makhija.

Cast 

 Farooq Sheikh as Siddharth Parashar
 Deepti Naval as Neha Rajan
 Rakesh Bedi as Omi Sharma 
 Ravi Baswani as Jomo Lakhanpal
 Leela Mishra as Dadi Amma (Neha's grandmother)
 Vinod Doshi as Neha's father
 Ranjan Grewal as Neha's brother
 Saeed Jaffrey as Lallan Miyan (shopkeeper)
 Amitabh Bachchan as himself (Guest Appearance)
 Rekha as herself (Guest Appearance)

Soundtrack 
All the songs were composed by Raj Kamal and were penned by Indu Jain. The film has a popular song "Kahan Se Aaye Badra", which has been set in Raag Megh (known as Madhyamavathi in Carnatic Music) sung by K. J. Yesudas and Haimanti Sukla.

Remakes 
 The plot of K. Bhagyaraj's 1981 movie Indru Poi Naalai Vaa had similarities with this movie.
 The 1984 Malayalam movie Odaruthammava Aalariyam directed by Priyadarshan had borrowed some elements from this film.
 2003 movie Nayee Padosan was partially inspired from this film.
 2013 film Chashme Baddoor was an official adaptation of this movie.

Awards

 29th Filmfare Awards:

Nominated

 Best Film – Gul Anand
 Best Director – Sai Paranjpye
 Best Supporting Actor – Saeed Jaffrey
 Best Comedian – Rakesh Bedi
 Best Comedian – Ravi Baswani

References

External links 
 
 Chashme Buddoor Storyline

1981 films
1980s Hindi-language films
1980s buddy comedy films
1981 romantic comedy films
Films scored by Raj Kamal
Films set in Delhi
Indian buddy comedy films
Indian romantic comedy films
Films directed by Sai Paranjpye